Charles Till Davis (14 April 1929 – 10 April 1998) was an American medieval historian of Tulane University who was an authority on Dante Alighieri. Charles Davis attended Davidson College before earning a Rhodes Scholarship to Oxford University, where he studied under the Italian historian Alessandro Passerin d’Entréves. Davis's doctoral dissertation, "Dante and the Idea of Rome," was published by the Clarendon Press in 1957 (before Davis was yet thirty years old). He taught history at Tulane University for over forty years and served as President of the Dante Society of America from 1991-1997. He was elected fellow of the Medieval Academy member of the American Philosophical Society. A prize is awarded annually at the university in his honor.

Selected publications
Dante and the idea of Rome. Clarendon Press, Oxford, 1957.
Ptolemy of Lucca and the Roman Republic. Lancaster Press, 1974.
Dante's Italy and other essays. University of Pennsylvania Press, 1984.

References 

1929 births
1998 deaths
Tulane University faculty
20th-century American historians
American male non-fiction writers
American Rhodes Scholars
Alumni of the University of Oxford
People from Natchez, Mississippi
Davidson College alumni
Fellows of the Medieval Academy of America
20th-century American male writers
Members of the American Philosophical Society
Dante scholars